The 1975 Soviet First League was the fifth season of the Soviet First League and the 35th season of the Soviet second tier league competition.

Final standings

Relegation play-off
 [Tashkent]
 Zvezda Perm     2-1 UralMash Sverdlovsk

Number of teams by union republic

See also
 Soviet First League

External links
 1975 season. RSSSF

1975
2
Soviet
Soviet